Abdoul Razak Seyni (born 1 January 1990) is a Nigerien professional footballer who plays as a defender for SONIDEP.

International career

International goals
Scores and results list Niger's goal tally first.

References

1990 births
Living people
Nigerien footballers
Niger international footballers
Sahel SC players
AS SONIDEP players
Association football defenders
Niger A' international footballers
2020 African Nations Championship players